"Rock wit U (Awww Baby)" is a song by American R&B singer Ashanti. Written by her along with Irv Gotti and Chink Santana for her second studio album, Chapter II (2003), and produced by Gotti and Santana, the song was released by Murder Inc. on May 19, 2003, as the lead single from Chapter II, peaked at number two on the US Billboard Hot 100 for one week and became her first international hit from her second album, reaching number 7 in the UK and number 19 in Australia.

Music video
Directed by Paul Hunter and filmed in Miami in early May 2003, the music video for "Rock wit U (Awww Baby)" features Ashanti at a beach with her boyfriend while they flirt in bed together and driving down the road in a Jeep. In some scenes, the boyfriend watches Ashanti dance for him in the house and behind some trees at night. There is also a scene where she rides on an elephant in the water. The video was nominated at the 2003 MTV Video Music Awards for Best R&B Video.

Samples
The song was sampled for British rapper Aitch's single "Baby". The single was released on 10 March 2022. It debuted on the UK Official Singles Top 100 on 18 March 2022, placing at number 2.

Track listings

Notes
 denotes additional producer

Credits and personnel
Credits lifted from the liner notes of Chapter II.

 Rob Bacon – guitar
 Milwaukee Buck – recording engineer
 Ashanti Douglas – vocals, writer
 Duro – mixing engineer
 Terry Hubert – recording assistant
 Irving Lorenzo – mixing engineer, producer, writer
 Demetrius McGhee – additional keyboards
 Andre Parker – producer, writer

Charts

Weekly charts

Year-end charts

Certifications

Release history

References

2003 singles
2003 songs
Ashanti (singer) songs
Music videos directed by Paul Hunter (director)
Songs written by Ashanti (singer)
Songs written by Chink Santana
Songs written by Irv Gotti